"Melting Pot" is the 1969 debut single from UK pop group Blue Mink. The song was written by Blue Mink's lead singer Roger Cook and long-time songwriter partner Roger Greenaway.

The song peaked at number three in the UK Singles chart in the first week of 1970, number 10 in Australia, and also reached number 11 in Ireland. "Melting Pot" did best in New Zealand, where it spent three weeks at number 2.

It became the opening track on the group's 1969 debut album, also titled Melting Pot.

While the song has assimilationist undertones, it is generally considered a plea for racial harmony.

The song featured on episode 3 of I'm Alan Partridge series 1, entitled "Watership Alan", in which Alan sings the song whilst exercising in his hotel room alongside Michael, the caretaker, who is clearing out an air vent. Alan asks Michael whether the song is racist, but Michael says no on the basis that Chinese is both a race of people and a food.

Formats and track listings 
7" (1969)
 "Melting Pot" (Roger Cook/Roger Greenaway)
 "Blue Mink" (Alan Parker)
7" (1969)
 "Melting Pot" (Roger Cook/Roger Greenaway)
 "But Not Forever"
7" (1975)
 "Melting Pot"
 "Gimme Reggae"

When the Cat's Away version

In 1988 "Melting Pot" was covered by New Zealand female vocal group and covers band When the Cat's Away.

Their version peaked at number one in the New Zealand charts, and charted for 15 weeks. The single was certified gold. It was one of three songs by New Zealand artists to reach number one in 1988.

The group released a low-budget, self-produced music video, directed by photographer Kerry Brown. The video features the group performing with a band in a white room, footage of people of different ethnic groups around Auckland, and cats.

Track listing 
"Melting Pot" (Roger Cook/Roger Greenaway)
"Fire" (Bruce Springsteen)

Other versions 
 The reggae singer Max Romeo covered the song and released it as a single on the Unity label in the UK in 1970.
 The New Seekers recorded a version for their 1974 album Together (member Eve Graham had originally been offered the song back in 1969).
 English pop group Culture Club played a live version of "Melting Pot" in 1983. The live song was made available on the 2003 digital remaster of their 1983 album Colour By Numbers.
 Boyzone recorded a version on their 1996 album A Different Beat, which also featured the vocals of Madeline Bell.

References

External links 
 
 When the Cat's Away music video
 
 Proposed New Zealand flag based on song

1988 singles
1969 singles
1969 songs
Songs written by Roger Greenaway
Songs written by Roger Cook (songwriter)
Philips Records singles